Conchobair Ó Dubhda (died 1291) was King of Ui Fiachrach Muaidhe.

Annalistic references

 1291. Conor O'Dowda (i.e. Conor Conallagh), Lord of Hy-Fiachrach, was drowned in the Shannon.

References

 The History of Mayo, Hubert T. Knox, p. 379, 1908.
 Araile do fhlathaibh Ua nDubhda/Some of the princes of Ui Dhubhda, pp. 676–681, Leabhar na nGenealach:The Great Book of Irish Genealogies, Dubhaltach Mac Fhirbhisigh (died 1671), eag. Nollaig Ó Muraíle, 2004–05, De Burca, Dublin.

External links
 http://www.ucc.ie/celt/published/T100005C/index.html

Monarchs from County Mayo
People from County Sligo
13th-century Irish monarchs
1291 deaths
Year of birth unknown